Ningde railway station is a railway station located in the Jiaocheng District of Ningde City, Fujian Province, China, on the Wenzhou–Fuzhou railway operated by the Nanchang Railway Bureau, China Railway Corporation. It opened on 1 October 2009. Ningde became a junction station with the opening of the Quzhou–Ningde railway on 27 September 2020.

References 

Railway stations in Fujian
Railway stations opened in 2009
Buildings and structures in Ningde